Linda apicalis is a species of beetle in the family Cerambycidae. It was described by Maurice Pic in 1906. It is known from China. It contains the varietas Linda vitalisi var. nigroreducta.

Subspecies
 Linda apicalis apicalis Pic, 1906
 Linda apicalis yunnanica Breuning, 1979

References

apicalis
Beetles described in 1906